Basil Al Bayati (born 13 May 1946) is an Iraqi-born architect and designer who has lived and practiced for the most part in Europe, in particular, London and who Neil Bingham, in his book 100 Years of Architectural Drawing: 1900-2000, has described as "an architect in whom East meets West." Al Bayati is considered to be one of the most important names in metaphoric architecture, an area he was at the forefront of pioneering, which uses analogy and metaphor as a basis for architectural inspiration as well as the "exploration of geometric and design patterns found in nature" .

He is also the inventor of what he termed "the mechanism of the wasitah (or excitor apparatus)" a geometric feedback mechanism for generating form and a method he himself often uses in the design process.

Throughout his almost 50 years working in the field of architecture, he has also designed furniture and artistic pieces for the household using such varied techniques as metalwork, inlay, glass and ceramic work and stonework as well as authoring 9 books, principally on architecture but also fantasy/fiction and autobiography.

"His work is manifested in plans and publications that express an exuberance for visual forms rare in the Arab world today…… His projects encompass a wide variety of architectural possibilities and transcend generally accepted patterns……. In all of his buildings an organic obsession with flower forms and old Islamic symbolism has been merged into a fantastic alternative architecture for the future."

He currently resides in Málaga in the South of Spain where he runs a successful architectural practice and cultural centre as well as continuing his writing.

Early life and education
Basil Al Bayati was born on 13 May 1946 in the neighbourhood of Adhamiyah in Baghdad, the sixth of ten children.

He began his architectural studies in the Faculty of Architecture at the College of Engineering, University of Baghdad, under the guidance of Dr. Mohamed Makiya.
Soon afterwards he became a member of the Iraqi Engineering Union, the Society of Iraqi Architects and the Society of Kuwaiti Engineers.

In 1970 he moved to London to continue his studies and once there, was granted a British Council Scholarship to attend University College London, School of Environmental Studies, Development Planning Unit, studying under Professor Patrick Wakely before attending the Architectural Association School of Architecture, where he worked with Paul Oliver, Geoffrey Broadbent and John Chris Jones. 
At the A.A he received a diploma in the post-graduate course of ‘Design Method and Creative Process’.  From here he continued his research into the psychology of creativity with Andrew Szmidla and spent a year researching structural engineering with Paul Regan before acquiring a BSc (Bachelor of Science) in Professional Practice from the Polytechnic of Central London in 1978.  Later that same year he was registered with the Architects Registration Board (ARB) and in 1980 he was elected into corporate membership of the Royal Institute of British Architects (RIBA).  In 1981 he became a Fellow (F.F.B) of the Faculty of Building (now known as the Forum for the Built Environment), in 1982 was elected member of the Incorporated Association of Architects and Surveyors, IAAS (now known as the Chartered Association of Building Engineers) as well as the British Institute of Interior Design (BIID).

In 1986, he was awarded the title of Doctor of Philosophy from University of London, School of Oriental and African Studies (SOAS) for his studies into Islamic architecture.

Having completed his doctorate, Al Bayati spent time travelling and studying various types of indigenous architecture around the world, in particular in India, China and the Near and Middle East and on his return he was elected a Fellow of the Royal Geographical Society (RGS) as well as the Royal Asiatic Society (RAS), the British Society for Middle Eastern Studies (BRISMES), and the Society for Moroccan Studies.

Career
Having graduated from the University of Baghdad, he opened his first practice, Basil Al Bayati & Partners, which he opened in Baghdad with a branch in Basra.

In 1970 he moved to London to continue his studies and whilst studying, worked in a number of architectural practices before becoming the Middle East Consultant at Fitzroy Robinson & Partners.  Here, in the mid-70s, he worked on a project to redevelop the White City Stadium, as well as a Liverpool Street/Broad Street redevelopment comprising a railway terminal, shops, offices, hotel and civic amenities.
In the late 70s he opened his first practice in London, Basil Al Bayati Architect, at 9 Montpellier Street, opposite Harrods, in Knightsbridge, London.

In 1983, he moved his offices to an old mill that he had restored and renovated on Miller’s Way in Shepherd’s Bush.  This became for him the busiest time in his career so far and was a highly creative period for him, designing and renovating buildings in both London as well as throughout the Middle East.  Much of his work at this time was also published in several books, the most notable being 'Basil Al Bayati: Architect' and 'Basil Al Bayati: Recent Works', the results of a fruitful relationship with Andreas Papadakis, of Academy Editions.

In 2003, he relocated his offices to what was already his private studio at St. Paul’s Studios, 141 Talgarth Road – in one of the famous artist studios designed by Frederick Wheeler in 1890.

In 2008, he moved to Málaga in Spain.  There he acquired a five storey listed building at Calle Marques de Guadiaro 3, designed by Jerónimo Cuervo, the Spanish architect responsible for a number of Málaga's most iconic buildings.  Shortly afterwards, work began on the full renovation of the building into an architectural centre, as well as the centre for his on-going architectural practice.

According to Jim Antoniou, "he has created an architecture based on stark symbols and historical notions which utilise geometric patterns ranging from square courtyards to domed ziggurats; reproduced objects in exaggerated size, from open books to tall palm trees; and explored technology from giant balloons to Islamic space shuttles.  In undertaking all these projects, Al-Bayati has shown an ability to translate the significance of symbols into dynamic and workable buildings, while retaining the simplicity of his original concept.  This is partly because his work is based on thoughtful research, and partly because he is able to give shape and form to what are essentially simplistic notions.  He is thus able to create architecture with all the inherent qualities and perceptions of workable buildings.  For although his buildings are based on simple concepts and often presented on an exaggerated scale, his attention to detail allows builders to remain not too distant from his unusual designs."

Notable works

Great Mosque of Edinburgh, 1987

Al Bayati is known in particular for the Great Mosque of Edinburgh, also known as the Edinburgh Central Mosque of which, Geza Fehervari, Professor of Islamic Art & Archaeology at London University, has said "The architectural elements and decorative details, while basically relying on Islamic, mainly Turkish traditions, successfully interact with the architectural and decorative age-old customs of Scotland."

"Al-Bayati’s detailed scheme will combine the calligraphic texts of mosque architecture with a chequered motif subtly derived from plaid-tartan."

The Palm Mosque, (Jama’a Al-Nakheel) King Saud University, Riyadh, 1984.

In 1982, Al Bayati won the 1st prize in the King Saud Competition to build the main mosque for the university.  His design incorporated extensively the motif of the palm trunk, as used in the very first Mosque of the Prophet in Medina.  It was highly praised and was even claimed to "mark the beginning of a new era, a new revival in Islamic architecture."

The interior calligraphy above the doors and in the mihrab was done by Ghani Alani, the last of the Baghdad School of Calligraphy.  He was a student of Hashem al-Khattat.  Ghani Alani taught Dr. Bayati whilst at the College of Engineering in Baghdad.  The building was also nominated for the 1992 Aga Khan Award for Architecture.

King Saud University Entrance Gate, (Faith & Knowledge), Riyadh

Dr. Bayati’s design for the entrance gates to the King Saud University is based upon the theme of faith and knowledge; two pillars of Islam that must be taken together, "Knowledge cannot do without faith nor can faith ignore knowledge for Islam calls always for faith and knowledge to run in parallel."

"The design consists of two books representing knowledge and faith. They have been so placed so that their pages are interlocked thus showing the close connection between faith and knowledge. Verses from the Quran on faith and knowledge are written in beautiful script on the cover of each book."

Church Island House, Staines, 1987

Church Island House was a building commissioned by the publisher of Academy Editions and Architectural Design magazine, Andreas Papadakis.

"For his luxury mansion on his Greek-island-in-the-Thames, the great man chose not Michael Graves, one of the deconstructivists or even CZWG, but pragmatic classicist Basil Al Bayati, whom he instructed to design a country house in the English turn-of-the-century manner."  The plan of the house is based on multiple units of structural geometrical forms and utilises extensive brickwork in a postmodern, art & craft style.  It was "designed in a vernacular manner, using building materials similar to those traditionally used in the area."

In 1988, Church Island House was exhibited at the German Architecture Museum in Frankfurt in an exhibition titled The Architecture of Pluralism that included work by James Gowan, Terry Farrell, Charles Jencks and some twenty other internationally recognised architects.

Hyde Park Gate Mews, London, 1990

This building reflects the more classical side of Al Bayati’s architecture and is a four storey post-modern classical townhouse in the heart of Kensington.  Architectural Design magazine wrote of him and this work: 
"He is steeped in the history of Islamic architecture, and deeply inspired by Persian tomb-towers, Cairo Mosques, Moghul palaces etc.  He is also, however, motivated by Western Classicism, in for example his project for Park Gate, London, drawn from the Classical ordering system of proportion, as well as the use of columns and mansard roofs."

The building can be seen as part of The Decorative Arts Society architectural walk – A Walk Around and About ‘Albertopolis’.

Oriental Village by the Sea, Dominican Republic, 1988

The Oriental village by the sea "is based upon Oriental building types arranged in a plan originating in patterns of insect and plant life.  The exoskeleton of a dragonfly forms the main body of the building’s layout, its triangular mouth of stairs on the waterfront leading to the creature’s circular head of the entrance lobby. The insect’s long segmented yellow body is the central corridor, dome-lit, which intertwines with a branch of a tree, its stem a road and its leaves the roofs of condominiums and leisure facilities.  The colourful berries are cone-topped villas intended to be reminiscent of Chinese temples."

This design was awarded the runner-up position and an honourable mention in the 1988, Las Terrenas Competition for Architecture.

Tomb of Gul Baba, Budapest, 1987

"Dr. Bayati’s design presents a large complex which successfully combines the styles of Ottoman architecture (as it was practised in Eastern Europe) and Hungarian architecture in the style of Lechner.  The platform on which this complex is envisaged is already standing.  The new buildings flank the turbe to the right and left.  The building to the left, or more precisely to the south of the turbe, is a mosque.  This is covered by three domes, all resting on drums of various heights, that in the centre being taller than the lateral ones.  Due to the cold climate of the country the mosque is entirely covered and is rectangular in shape.  Since colour is very much in evidence both on the exterior and interior of the building, it is envisaged that the mihrab will be coated with Zsolnay tiles and framed by a rectangular border containing Quranic inscription."

Ad-Dariyya Cultural Centre, Department of Antiquities & Museums, Saudi Arabia

"Inspired by the ruins of ad-Dariyya (Diriyah) the architect Basil Al-Bayati in his design for the new cultural centre incorporated some of the ancient architectural features.  There are the mud-faced walls with square and circular buttresses invoking the old fortifications as well as ornamental triangular perforations arranged in rows in imitation of those on the walls of the ancient buildings; doorways, too, have recessed upper portions in the traditional manner.  In this way the style of the new building reinforces the connection with the ruins of the old capital."

Other works

Furniture

After finishing his studies and whilst running his first practice, he became interested in furniture design.  Many of these early designs were created especially for architectural projects that he was working on.  They were made from carved wood, made with the assistance of the classically trained carpenter, Faruq al-Najjar and displayed Assyrian and Sumerian motifs together with muqarnas (a mixture of pendentive and squinch). i.e. the offices of the President of the University of Basra.

Later, in the early 80s, Al Bayati continued his experiments with furniture design, mixing floral wood-carving with geometric inlay and turned work. 
Much of this work was made in Cairo and India and was once again designed specifically for houses that had been built by him in the Middle East.  Some of these pieces are now on display in his centre in Málaga.

In the mid-80s Al Bayati’s furniture design took a bold turn – influenced perhaps by the wave of post-modern architects and designers of the time.  His designs attracted the attention of a number of flamboyant clients who commissioned suites for their weddings.  His furniture of this period was all made at the exclusive OAK factory in Cantu, Italy, owned by the Pologna family with whom Al Bayati became close friends.
His work, at this time, was considered by some to be post-modern although to others it readily escaped such definitions.  Michael Collins in his Post-Modern Design said of it: "Pluralistic Post-Modernism is evident in the exotic furniture designed by Basil-Al Bayati…….inspired by Persian tomb-towers, Cairo Mosques, minarets, and the balconies of Moghul palaces, to name but a few sources.  His is fantasy furniture, inflected towards Islamic colour and luxury."

In 2000 Al Bayati opened ‘Basil Leaf’, the first of a series of organic food shops in London in which all of the specialty gourmet food furniture and displays had been designed by him.
The design of these pieces was extravagant and theatrical, using Sumerian mythological figures, chariots, temples, elephants and even Saint Basil's Cathedral as sources of inspiration.  At the same time, the pieces were practical, functional creations – cake display cabinets, coffee grinders, fruit cabinets and so on.
A number of these pieces can be seen at his centre in Málaga.
In 2013, he was introduced by a mutual friend to Sidqa Usta, an expert craftsman from Istanbul.  Together they began working on a new line of new furniture that was to include tables, display cabinets and wall units, in a uniquely Arabesque style utilising wood, marble and bronze as the principal materials.  A number of these can now be seen in the centre in Málaga.

Metalwork
His frequent visits to Istanbul put him in touch with a number of local artisans, from sculptors, carvers, glass workers and metal workers.  One of these was Yuksel Ustaoglu, an expert metal worker specialised in bronze and brass.  Al Bayati began frequenting his workshop in the old Ottoman market and with Al Bayati’s designs, they soon began producing a collection of chandeliers and lamps made from bronze and brass, five of which can now be seen in the cafeteria of his Málaga centre.  The inspiration for this collection came this time from the natural world, in particular the geometric patterns and shapes of unusual sea creatures, blended with traditional old Ottoman-style lamps and lighting.

Glasswork and ceramic

In 1990, he designed a collection of cutlery and tableware, called the Palm Banqueting Suite, based upon the motif of the palm tree.  It was a one-off commission for one of his buildings for a client in Kuwait and was made by a local Italian artisan.  A reproduction of this set, made in Morocco, is on display at the centre in Málaga.

In 1980 he designed a glass fountain for one of the Saudi royal family.  The piece was so particular in its design that it took an expert glass-blower seven attempts before being successfully executed.

During the last few years he has continued his experiments, combining bronze and glass to create a series of bowls and sculptures that can be seen in the centre in Málaga.

Stonework

Al Bayati has also designed a number of features in stone usually as part of a larger architectural design.  Two of the most notable are the waterfall feature of Westbourne Terrace (see list of works) and the Palm Suite fireplace, with its delicate peacock motif.

Writing
Apart from writing books on architecture, Dr. Bayati has also published works of fiction and autobiography and has contributed articles to publications such as Building Design, Alam Al-Benaa magazine and others.  See below for a comprehensive list of books:

Books by Basil Al Bayati

Other books
Bingham, Neil. 100 Years of Architectural Drawing: 1900-2000. London: Laurence King, 2012.  
Collins, Michael. Papadakis, Andreas. Post-Modern Design. London: Academy Editions, 1989. 
Reynolds, Dwight (ed.). The Cambridge Companion to Modern Arab Culture. London: Cambridge University Press, 2015. 
Kultermann, Udo. Architecture in the 20th Century. Van Nostrand Reinhold, New York, 1993.  
Hattstein, Markus & Delius, Peter. Islam: Arte y Arquitectura. H.F. Ullmann, Berlin, 2007.

Other information of interest
Participated in the ‘Symposium on the Arab City: Its Character and Islamic Cultural Heritage’, 1981, held in Medina.
Served on the editorial board for the Alam Al-Benaa magazine, published by the Centre of Planning and Architectural Studies.
Served on the jury for the Arab Towns Organisation (ATO) Architectural award, Doha, Qatar.
Book reviewer for Building Design magazine and Alam Al-Benaa magazine.
Participated in the Arab Architecture Exhibition – Past and Present, organised by the Arab British Chamber of Commerce at the Royal Institute of British Architects, 1984.
Participated in the Venice Biennale of Architecture Exhibition in 1982, directed by Paolo Portoghesi exhibiting ‘Jama’a Al-Kitab’ - The Book Mosque, Al-Nakhlah Palm Telecommunications Tower and others.

List of works

(Non-exhaustive)

Further reading
 Antoniou, Jim. "Al Bayati in London" Royal Institute of British Architects Journal Vol. 96, No. 9, September 1989, pp. 32–33.
 "Aldarriyah-Cultural Centre" Architecture and Urbanism Vol. 01, No. 136, 1982, Tokyo, p. 9.
 Fehervari, Geza. "An Adventure in Islamic Architecture" Ahlan Wasahlan Vol. 9, No. 11, November 1985, pp. 30–33.
 Fehervari, Geza. "Revival in Islamic Architecture" Ahlan Wasahlan Vol. 7, No. 6, September 1983, pp. 15–17.
 Fehervari, Geza. "Towers in Islamic Architecture" Arts & The Islamic World Vol. 4, No. 2, Autumn-Winter 1986, London, pp. 29–32.
 Al Bayati, Basil. "Space of Freedom in Slavic Architecture" Alam Al-Benaa No. 109, 1990, Cairo, pp. 20–22.
 Antoniou, Jim. "Basil Al-Bayati Interview" Architectural Design Vol. 56, No. 12, 1986, London, pp. 16–23.
 Collins, Michael. "Classicism in British Architecture" Architectural Design - Prince Charles and the Architectural Debate Vol. 59, No. 5/6, 1989, London, pp. 57–62.
 "Analogy in Architecture of the Arab World" Alam Al-Benaa Vol. 2, No. 12, 1982, Riyadh, pp. 3–7.
 Antoniou, Jim. "A Future for the Past" Middle East Construction Vol. 10, No. 10, October 1985, pp. 31–35
 Kultermann, Udo. "Contemporary Arab Architecture" Mimar Architecture in Development No. 16, April - June 1985, p. 50.
 Al Bayati, Basil. "Function and Fantasy" Architectural Design No. 7/8 July–August 1992, London.
 Fehervari, Geza. "Az Elso Iszlam Muveszettortenet" Magyar Nemzet 26 May 1988, p. 4.
 "Islam Centre and Mosque in Edinburgh" Al Hayat No. 12932, 31 July 1998, p. 1.
 "Islam Centre and Mosque in Edinburgh" Al Arab 31 July-1 August 1998, p. 1.
 "Basil Al-Bayati - Architect - New Book" Asharq Al-Awsat No. 3825, 19 May 1988, p. 11.
 Al Bayati, Basil. "Built for Islam" Building Design No. 1029, 5 April 1991, p. 25.
 Al Bayati, Basil. "Design for Islam" Building Design No. 963, 24 November 1989, pp. 50–51.
 Fehervari, Geza. "Faith in Tradition" Building Design No. 940, 9 June 1989, pp. 26–27.
 Fehervari, Geza. "Back to Budapest" Building Design No. 985, 11 May 1990, pp. 34–35.
 Fehervari, Geza. "A Centre of Islamic Culture in Hungary" Arts & the Islamic World Vol. 5, No. 2, Summer 1990, London, pp. 46–48.
 Black, David. "Rushdie Protest Mars Ceremony" The Sunday Times Scotland 12 March 1989, p. 1.
 Yaseen, Nasir. "Architect Basil Al-Bayati and Edinburgh Mosque" Al-Quds Al-Arabi Vol. 10, No. 2869, 10 September 1998, p. 8.
 Latham, Ian. "Edited Highlights" Building Design 30 September 1988, p. 29.
 Imam, M. "Meeting Point for Minorities in Edinburgh" Asharq Al-Awsat No. 7185, 31 July 1998.
 "New Cultural Centre at Ad-Dariyya" Albenaa Islamic Architecture Vol. 2, No. 10, Riyadh, pp. 7–9.
 Holländer, Hans. "Besichtigung der Moderne: Bildende Kunst, Architektur, Musik, Literatur, Religion" Archis No. 9, 1989.
 "Outrage" The Architectural Review No. 10, October 1993.
 Walker, Frank A. "Eastern Promise with a Tartan Overlay" The Scotsman No. 45,596, 23 October 1989.
 "A Colloquium of Two Cultures, The Venice Biennale Explores The Architecture of Islam" Architectural Record February 1983.
 "Architettura Nei Paesi Islamici - Seconda Mostra Internazionale di Architettura" Electa Editrice Venice, 1982, pp: 91-93.

Awards
1982: King Saud University main Mosque Competition first prize.
1982: Abu Dhabi City Competition UAE third prize.
1989: Awarded an honourable mention by the international jury of ‘Las Terrenas’, competition for architecture, in the city of New York.
1990: First prize in a competition held by the MECO Sana’a Yemen (hotel and conference centre).

See also
 Iraqi art
 List of Iraqi artists

References

External links

Basil Al Bayati Official Website
Islamic Architecture
Beautiful Mosques Edinburgh Central Mosque
Edinburgh Great Mosque M.I.T
Decorative Arts Society Architectural Walks
Arab Culture & Civilisation Contemporary Architecture in the Arab States: Iraq
Beautiful Mosques of the World Edinburgh Central Mosque
Sur Newspaper Un arquitecto árabe invierte más de un millón de euros en un centro cultural
The Architects in Saudi Arabia Udo Kultermann
King Fahd Mosque & Islamic Centre
Dictionary of Scottish Architects
King Fahd bin Abdul Aziz HRH Prince Abdulaziz bin Fahd opens Edinburgh Mosque and Islamic Center
Bryophytes & Buildings of the Southside Central Mosque and Islamic Centre
The Mosque Today An Essay by Ihsan Fethi
Actual Experiences of Renewal Projects in Arabic Cities Qasr Ghumdan p. 159

Iraqi architects
Iraqi designers
1946 births
Living people
Writers from Baghdad
Architects from London
Iraqi emigrants to the United Kingdom
Artists from Baghdad